Karavan was a hard rock band from Karachi, Sindh, Pakistan, formed in 1997. The band was founded by former Awaz lead guitarist Asad Ahmed with bassist Sameer Ahmed, who were soon joined by drummer Allan Smith and vocalist Najam Sheraz. Karavan is known for fusing Eastern percussion and melodies with modern rock. Since its inception, the group has released five albums, including four studio albums and one live album.

They released their debut studio album, Rakh Aasm, in 1997. After two years, the band recorded their second album Safar with their new vocalist Tanseer Ahmed Daar since Najam Sheraz left the band to pursue a solo career. In 2002, Karavan released their third album Gardish, which included singles like "Aagay He Aagay", "Dil Ki Pyaas" and "Shor". After eight years, the band released their fourth album Saara Jahan (2010).

History

Formation and early years (1997–2000)
Asad Ahmed started working on an untitled project with longtime friend and bassist Sameer Ahmed. In February, after auditioning over fifty singers for their band, the duo picked Najam Sheraz, previously the lead vocalist of the band Wet Metal. Two months later, the trio made their national debut. Their first performance as a band, Karavan opened up for Nusrat Fateh Ali Khan at the Channel V concert.

Then the band started working on their debut album. After eight months, the band finished recording their debut album in August. In November, the band released their debut album, Rakh Aas. The band's first video premiere was banned by PTV due to the band sporting long hair and clothing deemed outlandish. By the end of the year, drummer Allan Smith marked his first appearance with the band. 

Karavan started off the New Year by playing a sold-out concert at PACC in Karachi. Their first single video, "Rakh Aas", passed the censor board and was aired on PTV. In May, Karavan performed at the Karachi Club, which was the last show by Najam Sheraz as part of the band. The band Circle, which opened for Karavan that night, had Tanseer Daar as their lead vocalist. The band started auditioning for a lead vocalist, and on 31 December, Karavan announced Tanseer Daar as their new lead vocalist.

The song Umeedain was recorded and released as the single for the World Cup album. Meanwhile, Tanseer finally made his live debut with Karavan by performing at the Pepsi World Cup concert. After releasing their single for the World Cup, Karavan started working on their second album Safar. They recorded their second album from June to November. On 31 December, Safar was released and the first single "Beqarar" from the album was shipped to different radio stations in the country. In January 2000, Karavan toured to promote their second album and shot a one-hour rockumentary on the making of the album, "Safar – A Visual Evolution". The rockumentary was aired on PTV world in two parts. It was broadcast in over 36 countries and to over 40 million people. Karavan continued to tour behind Safar as sales of the record started to increase.

Gardish (2001–2003)
In February 2001, Karavan re-released Rakh Aas and Safar with new covers and new tracks. In June, the band starts writing new material for their third album named, Gardish, and by August they recorded the third album in a barnstorming, 15-day session. The mixing of the album was done by next year in January till February.

In March, Karavan shot the video of the first single from their third album, "Aagey Hi Aagey" and the single made its debut on a new music channel, Indus Music in April. Karavan played this single for 30,000 people at the Dreamworld Resort and later played new songs in front of a crowd of 10,000 at the PAF Museum in Karachi. The band released Gardish in August. With the release of their third album, Karavan toured three major states in the US going to Houston, New York and Chicago in June 2003. By November, the band played at the UN World Food Program Show held in Islamabad. In December, Karavan released the second single from their third album, "Yeh Zindagi Hai", along with a video of the single.

Mainstream success (2004–2008)
On Independence Day, Karavan played at the unveiling of the largest national flag at the national stadium, sponsored by Shell Pakistan. In November, Pakistan Tobacco organised a rock fest with Karavan as headliners playing to a 2500-thousand-strong crowd in Islamabad. In December, the band was nominated for the "Best Live Act" at the 2005 Lux Style Awards.

In January 2006, "Shoure" video was released and was the fourth single released on their third album. In July, at the very first ARY Musik Awards, Karavan was nominated in four categories and Sameer won the Best Bassist Award. In December, Ufone launched Urock series of concerts across Pakistan to promote music and Karavan was one of the leading acts at these shows. In 2007, Karavan promoted their third album at the International Gardish tour and played at the Global Village Amphitheatre. Karavan then went on a tour of the encompassing interior cities of Punjab and Sindh.

In March 2008, Karavan played in front of a sold-out crowd at the Al Nasr Arena in Dubai. Karavan began writing songs for their fourth full-length studio album. Allan Smith and Sameer Ahmed lay down basic rhythm tracks.

Saara Jahan (2009–2010)
In March 2009, Karavan entered Shahzad "Shahi" Hassan's studios, the former Vital Signs man, to start working on the guitars and vocal tracks. By June to August the mixing of the tracks was finished, and the album is named Saara Jahan. In October, Karavan signs up with the ARY Musik Records.

On 4 March 2010, the first single, "Kaisay Mumkin Hai", from Karavan's fourth studio album was aired on ARY Musik. On 30 March, the band was welcomed at Play TV show "Girl Power" with DJ Sanam talking about the new video and album. On 10 April, Karavan performed at TIP College and the band debuted "Kaisay Mumkin Hai" for the first time live on stage. The band also featured on Radio One FM 91 on Dino's show. On 26 April 2010, The Muzik Records released Saara Jahan nationwide and promos of the album were launched on television for the promotion of the album. Later in the same month, Karavan was featured on ARY News.

On 1 May 2010, Karavan performed live at FAST University. On 15 May 2010, the line-up for Coke Studio confirmed Karavan would be featured in the third season. On 6 June 2010, the band performed "Yaadein" in Coke Studio's third season's first episode, 'Reason'. On 18 July 2010, Karavan performed "Kaisay Mumkin Hai" in Coke Studio's third season's fourth episode 'Form'. On 22 July 2010, Karavan released the video of their second single "Tu" from their fourth studio album.

On 28 May, Karavan performed at Rockstation concert held at Carlton Hotel in Karachi, Sindh. The concert was Karavan's last live performance. The band, during an interview with The Express Tribune announced their official break-up after 15 years. "We are done. Fifteen years is a big time period, and no more music will come with the current line-up," Asad told The Express Tribune. Adding to that, he said: “The break up is still very fresh. Let’s just take it easy for a while and see what happens. I don’t know with whom, but I will definitely make music.”

Reunion (2012)
The band reunited and performed live at a concert in Karachi after being in hibernation, or as reports say, “after they split-up two years ago."

Discography

Studio albums
 Rakh Aas (1997)
 Safar (1999)
 Gardish (2002)
 Saara Jahan (2010)

Live albums
 Unplugged and Unleashed (2005)

Band members
Final line-up
 Asad Ahmed – lead guitar (1997–2011)
 Sameer Ahmed – bass guitars (1997–2011)
 Allan Smith – drums (1997–2011)
 Tanseer Ahmed Daar – vocals, backing vocals (1999–2011)

Former
 Najam Sheraz – vocals (1997–1998)

See also 
 List of Pakistani music bands

References

External links
 Official Website

Pakistani hard rock musical groups
Pakistani heavy metal musical groups
Musical groups established in 1997
Musical groups disestablished in 2011
Musical groups reestablished in 2012
Musical groups from Karachi
Musical quartets